Two ships of the Deutsche Dampfschiffahrts-Gesellschaft Hansa were named Kattenturm:

, seized by Italy in 1916
, seized by the United Kingdom in 1944

Ship names